Lifter Puller is the debut album by the Minneapolis band of the same name. It was released on April 18, 1997 by Skene, and came out a month later in Italy. The album introduced a number of characters and themes central to later Lifter Puller releases, despite being characterized by a markedly inchoate version of their later sound. According to the Village Voice, it was, in fact "the one time they ever sounded like a generic indie-rock band" .

Track listing
Double Straps - (4:09)
Bloomington - (2:42)
Star Wars Hips (fast version) - (3:06)
Bruce Bender - (2:29)
Lazy Eye - (7:36)
The Mezzanine Gypoff - (2:39)
Jeep Beep Suite - (3:26)
Rental - (5:33)
Solid Gold Sole - (2:52)
Sublet - (2:59)
Summer House - (3:36)
Mission Viejo - (3:07)
Mono - (3:30)

References
Internet Archive of the official Lifter Puller discography
Village Voice retrospective/review of Soft Rock
Lifter_Puller_Pitchfork review
 

Lifter Puller albums
1997 debut albums